The Sikorsky S-32 was an American single engine aircraft built by the Sikorsky Manufacturing Corporation in 1926.

Design and development
The S-32 was a large single-bay sesquiplane using parallel interplane struts and bracing wires with three open cockpits, the rearmost cockpit for a pilot and two forward cockpits capable of holding two passengers each. The fuselage and wing were constructed from metal and covered with fabric. Powered by a  Liberty L-12 water-cooled V-12, it was built for the Andean National Corporation to explore Colombia and served as a floatplane fitted with pontoons.

Specifications (S-32)

References

S-036
Sesquiplanes
1920s United States civil utility aircraft
Single-engined tractor aircraft
Aircraft first flown in 1926